One Year is the debut solo studio album by English singer-songwriter Colin Blunstone, a member of the Zombies. It was released by Epic Records in 1971. It includes "Say You Don't Mind", which peaked at number 15 on the UK Singles Chart.

Production
After the Zombies disbanded in 1968, Blunstone left the music business only to return after the surprise success of "Time of the Season". Recorded between 1970 and 1971, One Year was co-produced by Blunstone's former Zombie colleagues Rod Argent and Chris White. Some of the songs had previously been recorded during the last days of the Zombies, although they were re-recorded for this album.

The album chronicled a year in Blunstone's life, during which he broke up with his then-girlfriend, actress Caroline Munro, to whom "Caroline, Goodbye" is obviously addressed.

Critical reception

Reviewing the album for AllMusic, Fred Thomas gave it 5 stars out of 5, writing: "Marked by a thoughtfulness that’s always on the brink of despair, One Year is an understated masterpiece. It drifts by quickly but connects immediately, capturing the same stir of conflicting feelings as remembering a time that will never happen again, or a romance you wish hadn’t ended quite so soon." Neil Tennant said: "It's an incredibly romantic album, which is why it's been with me such a long time." Thurston Moore called it "a gorgeous example of classic British pop music." He added: "It's very personal, very sophisticated in its sentiment."

In 2007, The Guardian included it on the "1000 Albums to Hear Before You Die" list.

Track listing

Personnel
Credits adapted from liner notes.

Musicians
 Colin Blunstone – vocals, guitar
 Rod Argent – keyboards (1, 4 & 6)
 Russ Ballard – guitar (1, 4 & 6)
 Jim Rodford – bass guitar (1, 4 & 6)
 Robert Henrit – drums (1, 4 & 6)
 Alan Crosthwaite – guitar (2)

Technical personnel
 Chris White – production
 Rod Argent – arrangement (1, 4 & 6), production
 Chris Gunning – arrangement (2, 3, 5, 7, 8 & 10)
 Tony Visconti – arrangement (4 & 6)
 John Fiddy – arrangement (9)
 Jerry Boys – engineering (1 & 2)
 Peter Vince – engineering (2-10)
 Paul Ostrer – photography

References

External links
 
 

1971 debut albums
Colin Blunstone albums
Albums arranged by Tony Visconti
Albums produced by Rod Argent
Albums produced by Chris White (musician)
Epic Records albums